Iván Gabriel López (born 17 February 1996) is an Argentine professional footballer who plays as a goalkeeper for Sacachispas, on loan from Ferro Carril Oeste.

Career
López started his career with Ferro Carril Oeste, with Walter Perazzo promoting the goalkeeper into his senior squad during the 2016 season. Having been an unused substitute for a fixture with Villa Dálmine on 19 April, López made his professional debut days later as they drew against Juventud Unida Universitario away from home. He participated in nine further matches in all competitions throughout that campaign.

Career statistics
.

References

External links

1996 births
Living people
Place of birth missing (living people)
Argentine footballers
Association football goalkeepers
Primera Nacional players
Ferro Carril Oeste footballers
Club Atlético San Miguel footballers
Sacachispas Fútbol Club players